The Council of State is a body established by the Portuguese Constitution to advise the President of the Republic in the exercise of many of his or her discretionary powers.

History
Although there are notices about the existence of a Council of State in Portugal before 1385, the first permanent regiment for its functioning was established by King Sebastian through his charter of 8 September 1569.

The Council of State continued to exist after the establishment of the Constitutional Monarchy in 1821. It was foreseen in the Portuguese Constitutions of 1822, 1826 and 1838.

After the 5 October 1910 revolution that established the Republic in Portugal, the Council of State was abolished, not being foreseen in the Constitution of 1911.

The Council of State was reestablished by the Constitution of 1933. It was again not foreseen by the Constitution of 1976. However, it was reestablished in 1984, following the revision of the Constitution of 1982.

Role 
Besides summoning and advising the President whenever asked to do so by him/her, according to the Constitution the Council must be summoned by the President before:

 dissolving the Assembly of the Republic and the Legislative Assemblies of the autonomous regions;
 declaring war and making peace, and
 removing the Government.

It must also be summoned by the acting President before:

 setting the date for any election;
 calling an extraordinary sitting of the Parliament;
 appointing the Prime Minister;
 appointing and discharging, upon a proposal from the Govt., the President of the Court of Auditors, the Attorney General and the Chief of the General Staff of the Armed Forces (CGSAF);
 appointing and discharging, upon a proposal from the Govt. and after consulting the CGSAF, an eventual Deputy Chief of the General Staff of the Armed Forces and the Chiefs of Staff of the three armed services;
 exercising the functions of Commander-in-Chief of the Armed Forces;
 appointing ambassadors and extraordinary envoys (upon a proposal from the Govt.), and
 accrediting foreign diplomatic representatives.

Counsellor of State

Membership 
According to article 142 of the Constitution, the Council is composed of the following members, known as Counsellors of State:

Ex officio members, who remain in office for as long as they hold office:
President of the Portuguese Republic (chair the Council)
President of the Assembly of the Republic
Prime Minister
President of the Constitutional Court
Ombudsman
President of the Azores Regional Government
President of the Madeira Regional Government
Former elected Presidents of the Republic
Five members designated by the President of the Republic, whose office ends with the term of office of the President of the Republic that appointed them.
Five members elected by the Assembly of the Republic, whose membership expires at the end of the legislature.

Taking Office and Term Limits 
The members of the Council of State are sworn in by the President of the Republic.

Members of the Council of State designated by the President and the Assembly of the Republic remain in office until the members who replace them in their respective positions take office.

Immunity 
Councillors of State enjoy immunity as a sign of the highest honour of the office they hold. Thus, a Councillor of State may only be brought before a court with the prior authorisation of the Council, which waives his immunity. Unlike the immunity of the Members of the Assembly of the Republic, which must be waived when the crime in question is punishable by a sentence of more than 3 years imprisonment, the decision of the Council of State regarding the waiver of immunity of one of its members is free. In case of refusal the suspected member only answers in Court when he ceases to be a Councillor of State.

Current Counsellors of State

Former Counsellors of State

References

Government of Portugal
Politics of Portugal
Advisory councils for heads of state